was a Japanese era name (年号, nengō, lit. year name) after Jōhō and before Eihō. This period spanned the years from November 1077 through February 1081.

Change of Era
 January 27, 1077 : The new era name was created to mark an event or series of events. The previous era ended and the new one commenced in Jōhō 4, on the 17th day of the 11th month of 1077.

Events of the Jōryaku Era
 1077 (Jōryaku 1, 1st month): Shirakawa  went to the Kamo Shrines; and he visited Kiyomizu-dera and other Buddhist temples.
 1077 (Jōryaku 1, 2nd month): Udaijin Minamoto no Morofusa died at of an ulcer at the age of 70.
 1077 (Jōryaku 1): The emperor caused Hosshō-ji (dedicated to the "Superiority of Buddhist Law") to be built at Shirakawa in fulfillment of a sacred vow. This temple became only the first of a series of "sacred  vow" temples to be created  by Imperial decree. Hosshō-ji's nine-storied pagoda would become the most elaborate Imperial-sponsored temple structure ever erected up to this time.
 1079 (Jōryaku 3, 10th month): The emperor visited the Fushimi Inari-taisha at the foot of Mount Fushimi and the Yasaka Shrine.

Notes

References
 Brown, Delmer M. and Ichirō Ishida, eds. (1979).  Gukanshō: The Future and the Past. Berkeley: University of California Press. ;  OCLC 251325323
 Nussbaum, Louis-Frédéric and Käthe Roth. (2005).  Japan encyclopedia. Cambridge: Harvard University Press. ;  OCLC 58053128
 Titsingh, Isaac. (1834). Nihon Odai Ichiran; ou,  Annales des empereurs du Japon.  Paris: Royal Asiatic Society, Oriental Translation Fund of Great Britain and Ireland. OCLC 5850691
 Varley, H. Paul. (1980). A Chronicle of Gods and Sovereigns: Jinnō Shōtōki of Kitabatake Chikafusa. New York: Columbia University Press. ;  OCLC 6042764

External links
 National Diet Library, "The Japanese Calendar" -- historical overview plus illustrative images from library's collection

Japanese eras